The 1910 Washington football team was an American football team that represented the University of Washington during the 1910 college football season. In its third season under coach Gil Dobie, the team compiled a 6–0 record, shut out five of six opponents, and outscored all opponents by a combined total of 150 to 8. Huber Grimm was the team captain.

Bill Libby chose Washington as the 1910 national champion in his book, Champions of College Football.

Schedule

References

Washington
Washington Huskies football seasons
College football undefeated seasons
Washington football